Stephen Mark Turner (born October 1971) 
is the Cleveland Police and Crime Commissioner (PCC). He was elected on 13 May 2021, for the Conservative Party.

Background

Prior to being elected as PCC for Cleveland, Steve Turner was the chief of staff for two MPs.  
He earlier worked for Safeway as a manager, but resigned in the early 1990s after accepting a police caution for handling stolen goods. Turner was elected as a UKIP Councillor for the Longbeck Ward of Redcar & Cleveland Borough Council on 7 May 2015 after receiving 19.8% of the vote. Councillor at Redcar and Cleveland Borough Council before he defected to the Conservative Party in 2017.

Police and crime commissioner 
In May 2021, Turner stood as the Conservative Party candidate in the Cleveland PCC election and was elected after winning 54% of votes in the first round. Turner assumed the role on 13 May, replacing the acting PCC, Lisa Oldroyd.

In September 2021, Labour MP Andy McDonald named Turner in parliament using Parliamentary privilege alleging Turner was sacked from a previous employer for "systematic theft".  Turner later admitted that he received a police caution in the 1990s for handling £15 of stolen goods, and voluntarily resigned from his position of store manager at Safeway in Norton.

In November 2021, it was reported that Turner was being investigated over a historical sexual assault claim. The investigation was being managed by the Independent Office for Police Conduct and conducted by a force external to Cleveland Police.  Turner rejected calls to resign over the claim, and was not been suspended from the Conservative Party despite calls from the Labour Shadow Home Secretary Nick Thomas-Symonds.  In May 2022 the investigation was discontinued with no action taken against him.

Personal life 
Turner is married to Redcar & Cleveland Borough Councillor Andrea Turner and has three adult sons.  He is also a grandfather.

References 

Living people
Police and crime commissioners in England
Conservative Party (UK) councillors
Conservative Party police and crime commissioners
1971 births